Sietse Rindert Fritsma (born 31 March 1972 in Franeker) is a Dutch politician and former civil servant. As a member of the Party for Freedom (Partij voor de Vrijheid) he has been a member of the House of Representatives since 1 September 2020. He previously served in the House between 30 November 2006 and 31 October 2019. He focuses on matters of social affairs, employment, political asylum and immigration. From March 2010 till January 2011 he was also a member and PVV fraction leader of the municipal council of The Hague.

He previously worked for the Dutch Immigration and Naturalisation Service (IND).

Fritsma studied human geography at the University of Groningen. He obtained a master's degree in spatial science, specializing in regional geography of developing countries. Around 1990 he lived for a year in an Israeli kibbutz.

References 
  Parlement.com biography

External links 
  House of Representatives biography

1972 births
Living people
Dutch civil servants
Dutch expatriates in Israel
Dutch geographers
Members of the House of Representatives (Netherlands)
Municipal councillors of The Hague
Party for Freedom politicians
People from Franekeradeel
Social geographers
University of Groningen alumni
21st-century Dutch politicians
20th-century Dutch people